California's state elections were held November 8, 1994. Necessary primary elections were held on June 7. Up for election were all the seats of the California State Assembly, 20 seats of the California Senate, seven constitutional officers, all the seats of the California Board of Equalization, as well as votes on retention of two Supreme Court justices and various appeals court judges. Ten ballot measures were also up for approval. Municipal offices were also included in the election.

Constitutional Offices

Governor

Lieutenant Governor

Secretary of State

Controller

Treasurer

Attorney General

Insurance Commissioner

Superintendent of Public Instruction

Board of Equalization

Overview

District 1

District 2

District 3

District 4

Judicial system

Supreme Court of California

California Courts of Appeal

Legislature elections

State Senate

There are 40 seats in the State Senate. For this election, candidates running in even-numbered districts ran for four-year terms.

State Assembly

All 80 biennially elected seats of the State Assembly were up for election this year. Each seat has a two-year term. The Republicans took narrow control of the State Assembly.

Statewide ballot propositions
Ten ballot propositions qualified to be listed on the general election ballot in California. Eight measures passed while four failed.

Proposition 181
(Passenger Rail and Clean Air Bond Act of 1994.) Proposition 181 failed with 34.92% of the vote.

Proposition 182
Passed by voters, but courts struck it down.

Proposition 183
(Recall Elections. State Officers.) Proposition 183 passed with 67.47% of the vote.

Proposition 184
(Increased Sentences. Repeat Offenders (Three Strikes)) Proposition 184 passed with 71.85% of the vote.

Proposition 185
(Public Transportation Trust Funds. Gasoline Sales Tax. Initiative Statute.) Proposition 185 failed with 19.47% of the vote.

Proposition 186
(Health Services. Taxes.) Proposition 186 failed with 26.58% of the vote.

Proposition 187

(Illegal Aliens. Ineligibility for Public Services. Verification and Reporting.) Proposition 187 passed with 58.93% of the vote.

Proposition 188
(Smoking and Tobacco Products. Local Preemption. Statewide Regulation.) Proposition 188 failed with 29.31% of the vote.

Proposition 189
(Bail Exception. Felony Sexual Assault.) Proposition 189 passed with 79.41% of the vote.

Proposition 190
(Commission on Judicial Performance) Proposition 190 passed with 63.87% of the vote.

Proposition 191
(Abolish Justice Courts) Proposition 191 passed with 61.05% of the vote.

See also
California State Legislature
California State Assembly
California State Assembly elections, 1994
California State Senate
California State Senate elections, 1994
Districts in California
Political party strength in U.S. states
Political party strength in California
Elections in California

External links

Official election results from the California Secretary of State
California Legislative District Maps (1911-Present)
RAND California Election Returns: District Definitions